Sadorus Township is a township in Champaign County, Illinois, USA.  As of the 2020 census, its population was 948 and it contained 423 housing units.

Geography
Sadorus is Township 17 North, Range 7 East of the Third Principal Meridian.

Cities and towns
 Ivesdale (east three-quarters)
 Sadorus

Unincorporated towns
 Jimtown
 Parkville
(This list is based on USGS data and may include former settlements.)

Cemeteries
The township contains these cemeteries: O'Brien (Section 32), Old Frame, Rice (Section 26), Rock, and Sadorus.

Demographics
As of the 2020 census there were 948 people, 376 households, and 240 families residing in the township. The racial makeup of the township was 91.03% White, 0.11% African American, 0.63% Native American, 0.53% Asian, 0.00% Pacific Islander, 0.21% from other races, and 7.49% from two or more races. Hispanic or Latino of any race were 2.64% of the population.

There were 376 households, out of which 25.50% had children under the age of 18 living with them, 51.60% were married couples living together, 6.91% had a female householder with no spouse present, and 36.17% were non-families. 25.00% of all households were made up of individuals, and 18.60% had someone living alone who was 65 years of age or older. The average household size was 2.29 and the average family size was 2.77.

The township's age distribution consisted of 18.9% under the age of 18, 3.4% from 18 to 24, 20.2% from 25 to 44, 30.8% from 45 to 64, and 26.6% who were 65 years of age or older. The median age was 51.8 years. For every 100 females, there were 93.0 males. For every 100 females age 18 and over, there were 98.9 males.

The median income for a household in the township was $56,875, and the median income for a family was $75,000. Males had a median income of $51,000 versus $22,083 for females. The per capita income for the township was $33,567. About 5.8% of families and 7.7% of the population were below the poverty line, including 14.7% of those under age 18 and 4.4% of those age 65 or over.

References
 
 United States Census Bureau cartographic boundary files

External links
 US-Counties.com
 City-Data.com
 Illinois State Archives

Townships in Champaign County, Illinois
Townships in Illinois
1859 establishments in Illinois
Populated places established in 1859